This is a list of notable people born in El Salvador or of Salvadoran descent (also see Salvadoran American).

Arts 

Consuelo de Saint Exupéry, painter, sculptor, and author; wife of Antoine de Saint Exupéry
Fernando Llort, painter and sculptor
Noe Canjura, painter
Nicolas F. Shi, painter
Patricia Chica, filmmaker
Ana Maria de Martinez, artist
Toño Salazar, caricaturist
Retna, graffiti artist
Giovanni Gil, painter, engraver and watercolorist
Rubén Martínez Bulnes, sculptor, architect

Scholars, authors and educators 
Alberto Masferrer, intellectual
Alfredo Betancourt, educator, philosopher
Ana Sol Gutiérrez, educator
Claribel Alegría, writer
Claudia Lars, poet
René Núñez Suárez, engineer
Ignacio Martín-Baró, social psychologist and priest
José Matías Delgado, writer, father of the Salvadoran fatherland
Juan José Cañas, writer, the national anthem
Manlio Argueta, novelist
Marcos Villatoro, author
Martin Guardado, applied linguist, sociolinguist, educator
Matilde Elena López, poet, essayist, playwright
Pedro Geoffroy Rivas, poet, scholar
Roque Dalton, poet
Salarrué (Salvador Salazar Arrué), novelist, poet, painter

Entertainment 
Cesar Ventura, Actor
Ana Villafañe, actress
Gerardo Celasco, Miami-born Italian-Salvadoran actor
Álvaro Torres, singer
Cáthia, singer, season 4 of the American The Voice
Sabi, singer
Crooked Stilo, urban artist
Efren Ramirez, actor
Isabel Dada, actress
J.D. Pardo, actor
DJ Keoki, techno DJ
Martina Topley-Bird, vocalist and songwriter
Pescozada, Latino rap artist
Pete Sandoval, drummer for the group Morbid Angel
The Fabulous Wonder Twins, entertainment personalities

Fashion designers and models 
Christy Turlington, American-Salvadoran supermodel
Francesca Miranda, internationally renowned fashion designer

Politicians
Alfredo Cristiani, former president
Álvaro Magaña, banker and interim president
Ana Maria, guerrilla leader
Anastasio Aquino, King of the Nonualco tribes, who defeated the government army in 1833
Antonio Saca, former president
Armando Calderón Sol, former president
Carlos Eugenio Vides Casanova, defense minister, convicted of human rights abuses
Cayetano Carpio, leader of the leftist insurgency, founder of the FPL.
Egriselda López, diplomat, Permanent Representative to the UN
Domingo Monterrosa, military commander of the Armed Forces of El Salvador during the Salvadoran Civil War
Farabundo Martí, revolutionary
Francisco Flores, former president
Gerardo Barrios, liberal president
Guillermo Ungo, opposition leader and former vice-president
Joaquín Eufrasio Guzmán, national hero
Joaquín Villalobos, noted guerrilla leader during Salvadoran civil war
José Inocencio Alas, former priest and activist
José Matías Delgado, national hero
José Napoleón Duarte, former president
Juan Rafael Bustillo, former Head of the Salvadoran Air Force
Manuel José Arce, decorated General, president of the Federal Republic of Central America, 1825–1829
Mauricio Funes, former president
Maximiliano Hernández Martínez, dictator-president
Nayib Bukele, current president
Roberto D'Aubuisson, politician, ARENA
Rutilio Grande, martyred priest
Marisol Argueta de Barillas, chancellor, ARENA, Senior Director World Economic Forum

Humanitarians and activists 
María Álvarez de Guillén, women's rights activist, writer, and businessperson
Prudencia Ayala, social activist and writer
José Castellanos Contreras, humanitarian
Rosa Amelia Guzmán, suffragette and journalist
Vicky Guzman, doctor and humanitarian
Morena Herrera, women's rights activist
José Gustavo Guerrero, lawyer, diplomat, humanitarian, first president of the International Court of Justice
María Teresa Rivera, women's rights activist
Óscar Arnulfo Romero, humanitarian, fourth Archbishop of San Salvador

Sports 
Ronnie Aguilar, basketball player
Dennis Alas, soccer player
Jaime Alas, soccer player
Rafael Alfaro, swimmer
Arturo Alvarez, soccer player
Frank Avelar, boxer
Juan Barahona, soccer player
Pamela Benítez, swimmer
Léster Blanco, soccer player
Nelson Bonilla, soccer player
Junior Burgos, soccer player
Rosemary Casals, tennis player
Darwin Cerén, soccer player
Óscar Cerén, soccer player
Mauricio Cienfuegos, soccer player
Jose Cortez, former NFL football player
Raúl Díaz Arce, soccer player
Roberto Domínguez, soccer player
Carlos Figueroa, judoka
Edwin Figueroa, mixed martial arts fighter
Andrés Flores, soccer player
Evelyn García, cyclist
Mágico González, soccer player
Tomás Granitto, soccer player
Carlos Hernandez, boxer
Emerson Hernández, racewalker
Gladys Landaverde, runner
Roberto López, rower
Ivan Menjivar, mixed martial arts fighter
Melissa Mikec, sports shooter
Alfredo Pacheco, soccer player
Denis Pineda, soccer player
Steve Purdy, soccer player
Joaquín Rivas, soccer player
Steve Rodriguez, baseball player
Ramón Sánchez, soccer player
Ricardo Saprissa, athlete, coach, and sport promoter
Rodolfo Zelaya, soccer player

Other
Ingmar Guandique, undocumented U.S. immigrant convicted in the death of Chandra Levy and two other American women
Jose Domingo Medrano, doctor and medical inventor 
José Salvador Alvarenga, claimed to have spent 13 months adrift in a fishing boat in the Pacific Ocean

See also
List of Salvadoran Americans
List of Salvadorian Olympians

References

List